Dr. Nova Riyanti Yusuf, SpKJ (psychiatrist) born in Palu, Central Sulawesi, was an Indonesian author. Nova often calls herself NoRiYu. Nova was a member of the House of Representatives as a representative of the Democratic Party for the 2009 - 2014 and 2014–2019 period. During her term as a representative, she initiated and supported the Mental Health Law (Undang-Undang Kesehatan Jiwa). The bill was passed into Law in 2014 (Law Number 18 Year 2014).

Education 
 TK Ora et Labora
 SD Ora et Labora
 SMP Al Azhar Pejaten
 SMA Tarakanita I
 The Writing School, Singapore
 Faculty of General Medicine, Trisakti University 
 Psychiatry Residency Program, Faculty of Medicine University of Indonesia 
 Research Fellow on Mental Health Implementation Research, Harvard Medical School, Department of Global Health & Social Medicine (2015)
 PhD from Public Health Faculty, University of Indonesia (2019)

Career 
In July 2019 Nova got a Doctorate in Public Health from the Faculty of Public Health of the University of Indonesia with a thesis entitled "Early Detection of Risk Factors for Adolescent Suicide Ideas in High School / Equivalent in DKI Jakarta".

Occupations and Positions 
 Member of Parliament, the House of Representatives of the Republic of Indonesia (2009–2014, 2018–2019)
 Deputy Chairperson of Commission IX (Ministry of Health, Ministry of Manpower & Transmigration, National Agency of Drug and Food Control, National Family Planning Coordinating Agency, The Indonesian Migrant Workers Protection Board) in 2012-2014
 Psychiatrist & Clinical Educator at Dr Soeharto Heerdjan Mental Hospital Jakarta (2016-2018)
 Consultant for WHO Indonesia on Suicide Prevention Strategy according to the WHO Framework on Suicide Prevention (2018)
 Author of 13 published books & screenplay
 Speaker on mental health issues
 Lecturer at Binus International, Trisakti Medical School, UPN Veteran Medical School, Paramadina University.

Organizations 
 Secretary General of Asian Federation of Psychiatric Associations (2019-now)
 Head of Jakarta Psychiatric Association (2016-2022)
 Chairwoman of the Alumni Association for the Medical Faculty of University of Trisakti (2021-2025)

Bibliography 
 Novel [Mahadewa Mahadewi] (Gramedia Pustaka Utama, 2003). 
 Novel [Imipramine] (Gramedia Pustaka Utama, 2004).
 Adaptation Novel from [30 Hari Mencari Cinta] movie (Gagas Media, 2004).
 Novel [3some] (Gagas Media, 2005).
 Collection of Essays [Libido Junkie: A Memoir for the Radicals] (Gagas Media, 2005).
 Adaptation Novel from [Betina] movie (Gagas Media, 2006).
 Adaptation Novel from [Garasi] movie (Gagas Media, 2006).
 Collection of Essays [Stranger than Fiction: Cerita dari Kamar Jaga Malam] (Gramedia Pustaka Utama, 2008).
 Screenplay [Merah Itu Cinta] (Rapi Films, 2007).
 Collection of essays [Atas Nama Jiwa (1 & 2)] (www.jakartabeat.net). 
 Memoir [A Rookie & the Passage of the Mental Health Law: the Indonesian Story] (Gramediana, 2014).
 Memoir [Interupsi! The Other Side of the Story] (Gramedia Pustaka Utama, 2015).
 Nonfiction Book [Jelajah Jiwa Hapus Stigma: Autopsi Psikologis Bunuh Diri Dua Pelukis] (Penerbit Buku Kompas, 2020); in the process of movie adaptation with Falcon Pictures.
 Nonfiction Book [Bunuh Diri Remaja: Yuk Deteksi!] (Penerbit Buku Kompas, coming in 2022).

Achievements 
 2020 MURI (National Record Museum) Record for the most frequent virtual speaker on mental health issues during 3-month of pandemic lockdown.
 2020 National Finalist The ASEAN - US Science Prize for Women.
 2016 Featured in The Saturday Profile “Freeing Mentally Ill of Stigma & Chains”, The New York Times.
 2016 Indonesian Caring Physician by Indonesian Doctors Association.
 2015 Mental Health Implementation Research, Harvard Medical School.
 2014 Community Mental Health Leader awarded by the Minister of Health Nafsiah Mboi. 
 2014 Most Powerful Woman by Her World Indonesia magazine.
 2013: Champion Parliamentarian by Asian Forum of Parliamentarians
on Population and Development (AFPPD). 
 2009 one of 10 Most Influential Female Legislators in Indonesia by Globe Asia magazine 
 2004 Winner of Fun Fearless Female by Cosmopolitan Indonesia magazine.

References 

1977 births
Living people
Members of the People's Representative Council, 2014
Women members of the People's Representative Council